Don’t Stop the Music is the third album by the American jazz fusion group, the Brecker Brothers. It was released by Arista Records in 1977.

Reception
AllMusic awarded the album with 3 stars and its review by Jason Elias states: "The funky and quirky "Squids" features Randy Brecker's customarily offbeat and singular electric trumpet work. Hiram Bullock's articulate guitar also shines on that track and he fit into the Breckers sound like no other player. "Funky Sea, Funky Dew" is a reflective, urbane mid-tempo offering that has great tenor solos from Michael Brecker". At the 1978 Grammy Awards the album received a nomination for Best R&B Instrumental Performance ("Funky Sea, Funky Dew").

Track listing
 "Finger Lickin' Good" (Randy Brecker, Ticky Brecker) - 3:58
 "Funky Sea, Funky Dew" (Michael Brecker) - 6:13
 "As Long as I’ve Got Your Love" (Doug Billard, Beverly Billard) - 4:14
 "Squids" (Randy Brecker) - 7:42
 "Don’t Stop the Music" (Jerry Friedman) - 6:30
 "Petals" (Randy Brecker) - 4:20
 "Tabula Rasa" (Randy Brecker) - 8:19

Personnel 

The Brecker Brothers
 Michael Brecker – tenor saxophone, flute
 Randy Brecker – trumpet, flugelhorn, electric trumpet

Other Musicians
 Don Grolnick – keyboards
 Doug Riley – keyboards
 Steve Khan – electric guitar, 12-string electric guitar
 Jerry Friedman – guitars (1), electric piano (5)
 Sandy Torano – guitars (1, 3)
 Hiram Bullock – guitars (2, 3, 4, 6)
 Will Lee – bass, backing vocals 
 Chris Parker – drums (1, 2, 3, 5)
 Steve Gadd – drums (4, 6)
 Lenny White – drums (7)
 Ralph MacDonald – percussion
 Sammy Figueroa – congas (7)
 Josh Brown – backing vocals
 Robin Clark – backing vocals
 Chrissy Faith – backing vocals
 Doug and Beverly Billard – backing vocals (3)

Horn Section
 Doug Riley – arrangements 
 Lou Marini – alto saxophone
 Lew Del Gatto – baritone saxophone
 Michael Brecker – tenor saxophone
 Dave Taylor – bass trombone
 Barry Rogers – trombone
 Randy Brecker – trumpet
 Alan Rubin – trumpet

String Section
 Doug Riley – arrangements 
 Gene Orloff – concertmaster 
 Jesse Levy and Richard Locker – cello
 Lamar Alsop, Alfred Brown and Richard Maximoff – viola 
 Sanford Allen, Ariana Bronne, Peter Dimitriades, Paul Gershman, Harold Kohon, Harry Lookofsky, Guy Lumia, Matthew Raimondi and Aaron Rosand – violin

Production 
 Steve Backer – executive producer 
 Jack Richardson – producer 
 Gene Paul – engineer 
 Tom Heid – technical recording 
 Craig "Cub" Richardson – mastering at J. A. M. F. (Toronto, Ontario, Canada)
 Bob Heimall – art direction, design 
 David Arky and John E. Barrett – photography

References

1977 albums
Brecker Brothers albums
Albums produced by Jack Richardson (record producer)
Arista Records albums